Cap and Skull is a senior-year coeducational honor society at Rutgers University, founded on January 18, 1900. Admission to Cap and Skull is dependent on excellence in academics, athletics, the arts, and public service. The organization considers leadership and character as factors for membership. Using these criteria, only 18 new members were selected each year.

History
On January 18, 1900, 10 members of the senior class of Rutgers College assembled in the Chi Psi Lodge to form the Cap and Skull organization. Drawing inspiration from Skull and Bones and Quill and Dagger, Yale and Cornell's senior class honor societies, Cap and Skull aimed to form a Rutgers honor society.

The 10 founders drew up a Cap and Skull constitution and adopted a code of secrecy and the motto, Spectemur agendo. To ensure the exclusivity of the organization, selection of a new member required a unanimous vote of the current members. In the first two decades, no more than 80 men joined the organization.

First World War
The 1920s found the college recovering from the First World War, and the Skulls began to reexamine their selection criteria to increase membership. Under the new system, each leadership position and honor on campus was awarded a points value, and students with the highest cumulative value were selected for induction into Cap and Skull. In 1923, in response to the growing student body, the number of members to be tapped each year was fixed at 12 and a tri-fold criteria for selection was established.
 Activities, athletic and campus
 Scholarship
 Character and service to Rutgers

Second World War
With the onset of World War II, many members of the Rutgers community left college to serve in the military. Only ten members were selected in 1944, and no one was tapped in 1945. In October 1945, members of the administration who were also Cap and Skull members were asked to make nominations for the class of 1946. Cap and Skull resumed the traditional 12-member selection in 1948.

50 year anniversary
On January 31, 1950, an all-day gala celebration was held in honor of Cap and Skull's golden anniversary – the first of the 10-year reunions that are still held today. The golden anniversary celebrated the 440 men selected as members of the society during those first 50 years.

Demise and rebirth
Through the 1960s, sweeping social changes occurred. Organizations such as Cap and Skull, came under scrutiny. In 1969, Cap and Skull graduated its last class.

Though Cap and Skull ended in 1969, the alumni of Cap and Skull retained their ties and the underlying need for the organization remained. In 1981, Rutgers College students again discussed the need for an organization or honor that would recognize leadership contributions made by members of the senior class. Cap and Skull re-emerged in 1982, and a reunion was held to celebrate the tapping of new members.

Centennial 2000
In 2000, the 100th anniversary of Cap and Skull, a large gala event was held and members donated a large endowment for an annual scholarship to Rutgers students. Also in connection with the centennial, a web site was launched and author William B. Brahms, a society member compiled a detailed history with full biographies of all inducted members of the first 100 years. It was privately printed by the society, but is available at the Rutgers University Special Collections and Archives. The history presented here is from Brahms' research.

Current status
Today, Cap and Skull represents many of the diverse organizations on campus and is now composed of undergraduate students from any of the university's reorganized schools. Formerly only members of Rutgers College (which had become co-educational in 1972) and Rutgers College affiliates from the School of Pharmacy, Engineering, and Mason Gross School of the Arts were tapped.

In November 1990, the Cap and Skull Room was formally leased, solidifying Cap and Skull's physical presence on campus. The appointed room features old photographs and several display cases filled with Cap and Skull memorabilia.

Notable members

 Richard H. Askin - CEO of Tribune Entertainment and president of Samuel Goldwyn Television
 Al Aronowitz - writer, influential behind-the-scenes 1960s culture-broker, friend of Ginsberg, Jack Kerouac, Neal Cassady, Amiri Baraka and George Harrison
 Walter W. Austin - CEO of Raleigh Bicycle Company
 Samuel G. Blackman - first reporter to break the Lindbergh kidnapping story. Held top news-editing position with the Associated Press
 John Joseph "Jack" Byrne Jr. - chairman and GEO of GEICO, which he pulled from the brink of insolvency in the mid-1970s, later served as chairman and CEO of White Mountains Insurance Group, formerly (Fund American Enterprises, Inc.), chairman of the board of Overstock.com 2005-06
 Clifford P. Case - member, United States Senate
 Jay Chiat - founder of TBWA\Chiat\Day advertising
 Stanley N. Cohen - pioneer of gene splicing
 Robert Cooke - first researcher to identify antihistamines
 James Dale - litigant in the noted 2000 United States Supreme Court case Boy Scouts of America v. Dale
 Richard M. Hale, founder, CEO and chairman of Halecrest, major supporter of Rutgers Scarlet Knights, namesake of the Hale Center Football Complex at Rutgers
 Homer Hazel "Pop Hazel" - All-American football star and member of the College Football Hall of Fame
 William Arthur "Billy" Hillpot - radio comedian, singer. Half of "Hillpot and Lambert" with Harold Scrappy Lambert a.k.a. "The Smith Brothers", vocalist on the 1927 hit "Ain't She Sweet" recorded under Ben Bernie.
 Franklyn A. Johnson - president of three universities, including Jacksonville University
 Robert E. Kelley - highly decorated and youngest lieutenant general in USAF history; superintendent of the United States Air Force Academy, 1981–1983
 Herbert Klein - member, United States House of Representatives
 George Kojac - member of International Swimming Hall of Fame, gold medalist in swimming at the 1928 Summer Olympics
 Norman M. Ledgin - journalist, author, Diagnosing Jefferson; Asperger's and Self-Esteem; The Jayhawker.
 Robert E. Lloyd - professional basketball player with the New York Nets, CEO Mindscape, chairman of the V Foundation for cancer research, which honors the memory of his former Rutgers backcourt teammate, Jim "Jimmy V" Valvano
 T. David Mazzarella - editor of USA Today, president of Gannett International.
 Anne Milgram - attorney general of New Jersey and first assistant attorney general of New Jersey
 Charles Molnar - inventor of the personal computer—LINC (acknowledged as the 1st personal computer by IEEE)
 David A. Morse - director-general of ILO who accepted the Nobel Peace Prize in 1969 on behalf of the ILO
 Robert Nash, "Nasty Nash" - the first football player traded in the NFL and the first captain of the New York Giants
 Ozzie Nelson - the man who defined the family television sitcom genre with The Adventures of Ozzie and Harriet
 Richard Newcomb - best-selling author of Iwo Jima! , Abandon Ship!  and other works.
 Randal Pinkett - president and CEO of BCT Partners, winner of The Apprentice 4
 Rebecca Quick - anchor for CNBC Squawk Box, played a crucial role in launch of The Wall Street Journal online.
 Rey Ramsey - American social justice entrepreneur, author. CEO of One Economy, a multi-national nonprofit that brings broadband to low-income homes and provides a multilingual web portal called The Beehive, which has over 9 million users.
 Roland Renne - president of Montana State University-Bozeman for 21 years.
 Paul Robeson - singer, lawyer, athlete, actor, activist, member of the College Football Hall of Fame
 Austin W. Scott - professor at Harvard Law School for more than 50 years and president of the Association of American Law Schools.
 John Scudder - physician and research pioneer in the field of blood storage and replacement
 Joseph Siry - NASA chief scientist
 Walter Spence - member of International Swimming Hall of Fame. In his first year of competitive swimming (1925), he broke five world records.
 Dick Standish - anchor and reporter on television and radio at KYW-TV in Philadelphia.
 Owen Ullman Sr. - news editor of BusinessWeek magazine, chief economic correspondent with Associated Press, noted White House correspondent, deputy managing editor of news USA Today
 Franklyn Van Houten - paleolimnologist after whom the Late Triassic-Early Jurassic cyclic deposit patterns in lakes were named "Van Houten cycles"; and the name given to the fossilized remains of the smallest known mammal to have ever lived (Batodonoides vanhouteni), which were found in a limestone formation that he had earlier named and studied.

See also
 Rutgers University
 Rutgers University student organizations

References

External links
 
 Article by Jason Gottlieb, C&S Class of 1994
 1912 The New York Times article on Cap and Skull inductees for the year.
 "Letters: Jun. 14, 1926". Time.

Student societies in the United States
Honor societies
Rutgers University
Student organizations established in 1900
1900 establishments in New Jersey